Henvey Inlet 2 is a First Nations reserve in Parry Sound District, Ontario, on the northeastern shore of Georgian Bay. It is one of two reserves of the Henvey Inlet First Nation.

The reserve is home to 87 Vestas wind turbines with a total capacity of 300 MW. Construction started in August 2017 and operation began in July 2019.

Demographics

References

External links

Ojibwe reserves in Ontario
Communities in Parry Sound District